Top Air (Trans Of Pattimura) was an airline from Indonesia, which offered scheduled passenger flights from its base at Jalaluddin Airport to a number of domestic destinations using a single Boeing 727-200 aircraft. Founded in 2004, it had its licence withdrawn in 2006. In February 2007, the Transportation Ministry delayed the license revocation of 11 idle airlines, including Top Air, to give restructuring opportunities to the owners, which did not materialize, though.

Fleet

One of its former B 737s (PK-BPW) is preserved at a location in Sukabumi, Indonesia.

Destinations 
 Cilacap - Tunggul Wulung Airport
 Putussibau - Pangsuma Airport
 Sofifi - Sultan Nuku International Airport
 Benjina - Benjina Airport
 Sampit - H. Asan Airport
 Karawang - Karawang International Airport
 Pandeglang - Tanjung Lesung Airport

References

External links 

Defunct airlines of Indonesia
Airlines established in 2004
Airlines disestablished in 2006
2006 disestablishments in Indonesia
Indonesian companies established in 2004